The Ursa Observatory is an astronomical observatory in Helsinki, Finland.

See also 
 List of astronomical observatories

References

External links 

Astronomical observatories in Finland
Buildings and structures in Helsinki